Onoz may refer to:
 Onoz, Namur, a section of Jemeppe-sur-Sambre, province of Namur, Belgium
 Onoz, Jura, a commune in the French region of Franche-Comté